Hana Mandlíková defeated the defending champion Martina Navratilova in the final, 7–5, 7–6(7–1) to win the women's singles tennis title at the 1987 Australian Open.

There was no Australian Open in 1986, due to the administrative changes to make the tournament the opening major of the year. The 1987 championship therefore followed the 1985 tournament, held over a year earlier.

This was the last edition of the tournament to be held on grass courts, as it would switch to hardcourts the following year.

Seeds

Qualifying

Draw

Finals

Top half

Section 1

Section 2

Section 3

Section 4

Bottom half

Section 5

Section 6

Section 7

Section 8

External links
 1987 Australian Open – Women's draws and results at the International Tennis Federation

Women's singles
Australian Open (tennis) by year – Women's singles
1987 in Australian women's sport
1987 Virginia Slims World Championship Series